Enderûnlu Fâzıl (1757–1810) was an Ottoman poet who depicted the beauty of men from various lands of the Ottoman Empire.

He achieved fame through his erotic works, which were published posthumously. Among his most famous works is The Book of Women, which was banned in the Ottoman Empire. The book describes the advantages and disadvantages of women from different nations.

Life
Fâzıl was born in Acre into an Arab family originally of Medina. He spent his early years in Safed in Ottoman Palestine. His grandfather Zahir al-Umar and father Ali Tâhir were both executed (in 1775 and 1776, respectively) for participating in a rebellion. After his father's death, Fâzıl moved to Istanbul. There, he was admitted to the Enderun palace school (taking the name Enderuni or Enderûnlu), but was expelled in 1783 as a result of his love affairs with other men there.

In 1799 he was exiled to Rhodes because of his satirical writings and was only allowed to return to Istanbul after becoming blind. He spent the rest of his life there, ill and bedridden. He is buried in a tomb in Eyüp.

Works

"Divan"
"The Book of Love "
"The Book of the Beautiful [Men]"
"The Book of Women"
"The Book of the Dancers"

References

 Enderunlu Fazil. In: Türkiye Diyanet Vakfi Ansiklopedisi Islam. 11 TDV Yayını, Istanbul 1995 (in Turkish). 
 JH Mordtmann: Fadil Bey. In: The Encyclopaedia of Islam. New Edition. 2 Brill, Leiden, p. 727 s. (In English).

External links
 Enderûnlu Fâzıl – Ministry Of Culture And Tourism

1757 births
1810 deaths
18th-century writers from the Ottoman Empire
18th-century poets from the Ottoman Empire
19th-century poets from the Ottoman Empire
Gay poets
Turkish gay writers
Turkish LGBT poets
People from Safed
Arabs from the Ottoman Empire
18th-century Arabs